Sir William Alexander (c. 1602 – 18 May 1638) was the founder, in 1629, of the Scottish colony of Nova Scotia with the establishment of Charles Fort, now the site of modern Annapolis Royal, Nova Scotia, Canada. Alexander was the son of colonizer William Alexander, 1st Earl of Stirling, but predeceased his father and never assumed his title.

It was on the site of Charles Fort that the returning French in 1632 built their second settlement known by the name of Port-Royal.   

For many years the site of Alexander's settlement, known as Charles Fort or Scots Fort, was thought to be on the hillside overlooking the Habitation. This site, marked by a stone monument and brass plaque, was designated a National Historic Site of Canada in 1951. The plaque has been removed and relocated as the actual site of Charles Fort has been established through archaeological evidence at Annapolis Royal; lying beneath Fort Anne.

References

External links

1600s births
1638 deaths
People from Annapolis County, Nova Scotia
Pre-Confederation Nova Scotia people
Explorers from the Kingdom of Scotland
Scottish knights
Emigrants from the Kingdom of Scotland to Nova Scotia
Governors of Acadia
17th-century Scottish businesspeople